Cornwallite is an uncommon copper arsenate mineral with formula Cu5(AsO4)2(OH)4. It forms a series with the phosphate pseudomalachite and is a dimorph of the triclinic cornubite. It is a green monoclinic mineral which forms as radial to fibrous encrustations.

Discovery and occurrence

It was first described in 1846, for an occurrence in Wheal Gorland, St Day United Mines of the St Day District, Cornwall, England. It occurs as  secondary mineral in the oxidized zone of copper sulfide deposits.  Associated minerals include olivenite, cornubite, arthurite, clinoclase, chalcophyllite, strashimirite, lavendulan, tyrolite, spangolite, austinite, conichalcite, brochantite, azurite and malachite.

See also
 Kernowite, another mineral named after Cornwall

References

Arsenate minerals
Monoclinic minerals
Minerals in space group 14